Sun Laiyan (born October 1957) is a Chinese scientist who served as the Administrator of the China National Space Administration (CNSA) from 2004 to 2010, when he was succeeded by Chen Qiufa.

Early life 
Sun was born in Beijing in October 1957.

Education 
Sun attended Xi'an Jiaotong University majoring in cryogenic engineering.

Career 
After graduating in 1982, Sun joined the Beijing Institute of Satellite Environment Engineering as an Engineering Team Leader. From 1987 to 1993 he attended Paris No. 6 University and received a Ph.D. Moving back to China, he became first the deputy director and the director of the Institute of Satellite Environment Engineering. In 1999, he was made the Vice-Administrator of the CNSA and in 2001 the Secretary General of the Commission of Science, Technology and Industry for National Defense (COSTIND). In 2004, he was appointed Vice-Minister for COSTIND and Administrator for CNSA.

Personal life 
Sun is married with one daughter.

References
"Administrators" from CNSA website. Accessed 24 July 2005.

1957 births
Living people
Scientists from Beijing
Xi'an Jiaotong University alumni
Pierre and Marie Curie University alumni
China National Space Administration people